Marvin may refer to:


Geography
In the United States
 Marvyn, Alabama, also spelled Marvin, an unincorporated community
 Marvin, Missouri, an unincorporated community
 Marvin, North Carolina, a village
 Marvin, South Dakota, a town
 Robley, Virginia, also known as Marvin
 Lake Marvin, a lake in Georgia

Elsewhere
 Marvin Islands, Nunavut, Canada

People and fictional characters
 Marvin (given name), including a list of people and fictional characters
 Marvin (surname), including a list of people and fictional characters

Arts and entertainment
 Marvin the Album, an album by the Australian group Frente!
 "Marvin (Patches)", a song by Titãs
 "Marvin" (Marvin the Paranoid Android song), a song by Marvin the Paranoid Android (1981)
 Marvin (film), a 2017 French film
 Marvin (comic), a newspaper comic strip

Other uses
 Marvin (robot), developed by the University of Kaiserslautern Robotics Research Lab in Germany

See also 
 Marven Gardens, a housing area in Margate City, New Jersey, in the United States
 Marvin the Martian, an extraterrestrial character from Warner Bros.' cartoons